Campus Town Station is a subway station on Line 1 of the Incheon Subway in Jiha66, Songdogukje-daero, Yeonsu-gu, Incheon. Its other name is Yonsei University.

History
The station was opened on June 1, 2009. On September 3, 2013, by the 13th announced of the National Police Agency, the station name changed to Campus Town (Entrance of the National Maritime Police Agency) Station. On November 19, 2014, it was rename back to Campus Town Station.

Station layout

References

External links

Metro stations in Incheon
Seoul Metropolitan Subway stations
Railway stations opened in 2009
Yeonsu District